Koester/Patburg House is a historic home located at Evansville, Indiana. It was built in 1873–1874, and is a two-story, rectangular, Italianate style brick dwelling.  It has a low-pitched front gable roof and features a bracketed cornice and paneled frieze and original slatted shutters. It has a porch and porte cochere added in the 1920s.  It was originally built as the country home of a wholesale grocer.

It was added to the National Register of Historic Places in 1983.

References

Houses on the National Register of Historic Places in Indiana
Italianate architecture in Indiana
Houses completed in 1874
Houses in Evansville, Indiana
National Register of Historic Places in Evansville, Indiana